Karma, in several Eastern religions, is the concept of "action" or "deed", understood as that which causes the entire cycle of cause and effect.

Karma may also refer to:

Computing
 KARMA attack, an attack capable of exploiting some WiFi systems
 Karma, a physics engine used in Unreal Engine 2
 Karma, a trust metric in online moderation or rating systems
 Karma, the voting system on Reddit
 Karma spyware, an iPhone spyware tool used by Dark Matter

Film and television
 Karma (1933 film), a Hindi- and English-language film
 Karma (1981 film), a Filipino drama film
 Karma (1986 film), an Indian Hindi film
 Karma (1995 film), a Malayalam film of 1995
 Karma (2008 Indian film), an English-language psychological thriller film
 Karma (2008 Indonesian film), a paranormal drama film
 Karma (2010 film), an Indian Telugu film
 Karma (2012 film), a Sinhala adult drama film
 Karma (2015 Thai film), a horror film
 Karma (2015 Tamil film), a murder mystery film
 Karma (2004 TV series), an Indian superhero television series
 Karma (2015 TV series), a Hong Kong horror television series
 Karma (2020 TV series), an American children's reality web series
 "Karma" (How I Met Your Mother), a television episode
 "Karma" (Person of Interest), a television episode

Music
 Karma (American band), a progressive rock/jazz band
 Karma Productions or Carvin & Ivan, a music production duo

Albums
 Karma (Delerium album) (1997)
 Karma (Robin Eubanks album) (1991)
 Karma (Fanatic Crisis album) (1994)
 Karma (Kamelot album) (2001)
 Karma (Mucc album) (2010)
 Karma (Pharoah Sanders album) (1969)
 Karma (Mike Singer album) (2017)
 Karma (Rick Springfield album) (1999)
 Karma (Tarkan album) (2001)
 Karma (Winger album) (2009)

Songs
 "Karma" (Alicia Keys song), 2004
 "Karma" (Alma song), 2016
 "Karma" (Anxhela Peristeri song), 2021
 "Karma" (Bump of Chicken song), 2005
 "Karma" (Kokia song), 2009
 "Karma" (Lloyd Banks song), 2004
 "Karma" (Marina song), 2019
 "Karma" (The Black Eyed Peas song), 1999
 "Karma" (The Saturdays song), 2010
 "Karma (What Goes Around)" (1200 Techniques song), 2002
 "Karma (Comes Back Around)", by Adam F from Kaos: The Anti-Acoustic Warfare, 2001
 "Karma", by AJR from Neotheater, 2019
 "Karma", by Burhan G & L.O.C. from Din for Evigt, 2013
 "Karma", by Darin from Flashback, 2008
 "Karma", by deSol from deSol, 2005
 "Karma", by Diffuser from Mission: Impossible 2, 2000
 "Karma", by Estelle from Lovers Rock, 2018
 "Karma", by Faizal Tahir from Adrenalin, 2010
 "Karma", by Fear, and Loathing in Las Vegas from Hypertoughness, 2019
 "Karma", by Jessica Andrews from Who I Am, 2001
 "Karma", by Joss Stone from LP1, 2011
 "Karma", by Kamelot from Karma, 2001
 "Karma", by Mike Singer from Karma, 2017
 "Karma", by Opeth from My Arms, Your Hearse, 1998
 "Karma", by Parkway Drive from Deep Blue, 2010
 "Karma", by Taylor Swift from Midnights, 2022
 "Karma", by The Reklaws from Sophomore Slump, 2020

People

Given name
 Karma (archer) (born 1990), Bhutanese archer
 Karma Chagme, 17th-century Tibetan lama
 Karma Phuntsho, Bhutanese scholar
 Karma Phuntsok (born 1952), Tibetan painter
 Karma Rigzin, Bhutanese police officer and UN peacekeeper
 Karma Thinley Rinpoche (born 1931), Tibetan lama resident in Canada
 Karma Thutob Namgyal (died 1610), prince of the Tsangpa Dynasty that ruled parts of Central Tibet
 Karma Tsewang (born 1988), Indian footballer
 Karma Yonzon, Nepali musician and composer
 Karma-Ann Swanepoel, South African-born singer, as Karma

Nickname
 Karma (Call of Duty player) or Damon Barlow (born 1993)
 Karma (Halo player) or Ben Jackson (born 1988)

Places
 Karma, Karma District, a village in Belarus
 Karma District, an administrative subdivision in Belarus
 Karma, Koderma, a census town in Koderma district, Jharkhand, Bihar
 Karma, Koderma, Jharkhand, India
 Karma (Iran), a small city in Iraq
 Karma, Niger
 Karma, Hebron, a Palestinian village
 Karma valley, a Himalayan valley, Tibet

Vehicles
 Fisker Karma, a hybrid electric sportscar
 Karma Revero, a hybrid electric sportscar that replaced the Fisker Karma
 Karma Automotive, an automaker

Other uses
 Karma (character), a Marvel Comics hero
 Karma (company), a WiFi-based ISP
 Karma (novel), a 2014 novel by Karanam Pavan Prasad
 "Karma" (short story), a short story by Khushwant Singh
 Karma Nightclub & Cabaret, a former gay nightclub in Lincoln, Nebraska
 Korg KARMA, a workstation, the first implementation of the KARMA music system
 Karma, a dog food brand of Procter & Gamble

See also

 Karma-Ann Swanepoel, lead singer of Henry Ate
 Karra (disambiguation)
 Karuma, a settlement in Uganda
 Kharma (wrestler) or Kia Stevens (born 1977), American professional wrestler and actress
 Karmah (disambiguation)
 Kama, "desire, wish, longing" in Indian literature